This is a list of public holidays in the Cocos (Keeling) Islands.

Public holidays

See also
Public holidays in Australia

References

External links

Cocos (Keeling) Islands culture
Cocos (Keeling) Islands
Public holidays in Australia
Cocos (Kneeling) Islands